Barclay Macbride Crenshaw (born July 7, 1971), who is known by the stage name Claude VonStroke, is an American house producer based in Los Angeles. He owns Dirtybird Records based in San Francisco. In July 2006 he released his debut album, Beware of the Bird. He has produced a 'Fabric' mix, which was released in May 2009, and has also appeared on Pete Tong's Essential Mix Radio show in 2007, 2013, and 2020. In 2009, he released his second studio album, Bird Brain. In 2016, he was named America's Best DJ in Pioneer DJ and DJ Times’ annual poll. In 2017, he was nominated at the Electronic Music Awards for both DJ of the Year and Radio Show of the Year for "The Birdhouse".

Biography 
Barclay Macbride Crenshaw was born in Cleveland, Ohio and lived there until he was in seventh grade. His family then moved to Detroit. Having his own radio show in high school, Crenshaw had an interest in hip-hop music at first, but then embraced electronic music. Later he moved to Los Angeles, where he worked on numerous movie productions as location scout and production assistant. From 2002 to 2003 he worked on the documentary Intellect: Techno House Progressive, for which he interviewed more than 50 well-known DJs.

In the early 2000s, Claude met up with "The Martin Brothers," Justin Martin and Christian Martin. In January 2005 he formed the Dirtybird Records label. His wife, Aundy, helped fund the original start of the Dirtybird label under the holding Company Crenshaw Creative, of which Aundy is now the chief operating officer and chief marketing officer. She gave him one year to turn it into a successful record label and would have cut him off if the label did not succeed. The Fabric imprint invited Barclay early in his DJ career to do a mix, and he accepted saying, "Fabric called me, and of course I agreed without hesitation. I have wanted to mix one of the Fabric series since I started DJing house. I feel like it is a nice achievement for a DJ, something that says, 'OK, this person is legit."

Dirtybird records
Crenshaw's record label, Dirtybird Records has been recognized as one of the top independent electronic music record labels in the world. In 2017, Mixmag named Dirtybird "label of the decade," and Billboard Magazine named the label one of "the best 5 independent dance labels of 2017." Notable artists from the label include Justin Martin, Steve Darko, Walker & Royce, and Green Velvet.

Recent projects 
In 2014, Claude began collaborating with Green Velvet (another veteran artist who grew up in the Mid-West), to form a side project known as Get Real. The duo first met during the Winter Music Conference in Miami where the two were accidentally scheduled simultaneously. Their first release came out as an EP on Dirtybird, with the appearance of “Mind Yo Bizness” and “Snuffaluffagus". Claude has stated, “Nobody is trying to steal the spotlight or take over the project which isn’t always the case in a duo. We each represent our style but we make a new style by working together.”

Claude also debuted another project (this time in 2015) which he has continued with til today – Barclay Crenshaw. His self-titled debut album kicked off his "left-field departure from his better-known alias, Claude VonStroke" by delivering "slowed-down, emotive collection of collaborations and instrumentals" or otherwise touted as 'alien hip hop music'.

Discography 

Studio albums
 2006: Beware of the Bird
 2009: Bird Brain
 2013: Urban Animal
 2017: Barclay Crenshaw
 2020: Freaks & Beaks

Extended plays
 2021: Enthusiasm (with Walker & Royce)
 2021: Everything Is Burning (with Nala)

Singles
 2006: The Whistler
 2006: Deep Throat
 2006: Who's Afraid of Detroit?
 2007: Groundhog Day
 2008: Scarlet Macaw
 2009: Beat That Bird (with Justin Martin)
 2009: Vocal Chords
 2009: Monster Island
 2010: California (with J Phlip)
 2012: Ignorance Is Bliss (with Eats Everything)
 2012: Le Fantome (with Jaw)
 2018: Walay (My Bae)
 2018: Raw Nerve
 2018: Maharaja
 2019: Comments (with ZDS featuring Ke)
 2020: All the People in the House
 2020: I'm Solo (featuring Barry Drift)
 2020: Fly Guy (with Marc Houle)
 2020: Raggadagga (with Catz 'n Dogz)

Remixes
 2006: Soul Avengerz Feat. Javine – Don't Let The Morning Come (Claude Von Stroke and Justin Martin Remix)
 2006: Fedde Le Grand – Put Your Hands Up for Detroit (Claude Von Stroke Packard Plant Remix)
 2006: Andy Caldwell – Warrior (Claude VonStroke Sharp Toof Mix)
 2007: Samim – Heater (Claude VonStroke Remix)
 2007: The Rapture – W.A.Y.U.H. (Whoo! Alright – Yeah ... Uh Huh) People Don't Dance No More (Claude's Vocal Pantydropper Mix)
 2007: Mighty Dub Katz – Magic Carpet Ride (Claude Vonstroke 'Sucker Free City Edition')
 2009: Kevin Saunderson – The Human Bond (Claude VonStroke Rave Recognize Rave Mix)
 2010: Chilly Gonzales – I Am Europe (Claude Von Stroke Take A Trip Mix)
 2010: Cajmere – Percolator (Claude VonStroke Remix)
 2012: Kimbra – Old Flame (Claude VonStroke Remix)
 2015: Rihanna – Bitch Better Have My Money (Claude VonStroke Remix)
 2015: The Chemical Brothers – Go (Claude VonStroke Remix)
 2015: Disclosure – Omen (Claude VonStroke Remix)
 2017: Rodriguez Jr. - An Evidence of Time (Claude VonStroke Remix)
 2018: Elderbrook - Capricorn (Claude VonStroke Remix)
 2018: Tom Flynn featuring Amp Fiddler - The Future (Claude VonStroke Remix)
 2020: Marc Houle - Arizona (Claude VonStroke Remix)

References

External links 

 
 
 Claude VonStroke at dirtybirdrecords.com
 Claude VonStroke at mothershipmusic.com

1971 births
Living people
Record producers from Ohio
American DJs
DJs from Detroit
Musicians from Detroit
Deep house musicians
Musicians from Cleveland
Electronic dance music DJs
House musicians